Musse Olol, also known as Muse A. Olol Diinle, is a Somali-American engineer and social activist. He is the Chairman of the Somali American Council of Oregon (SACOO).

Background

Early years
Olol was born and raised in Mogadishu, the capital of Somalia. He later emigrated to Oregon in the United States, where he would live for the next 30 years. He eventually became an American citizen.

Education
For his post-secondary education, Olol attended the local Portland State University. There, he earned a degree in mechanical engineering.

Career
Olol is an engineer by profession. He specializes in water and wastewater engineering.

Olol is noted for his social work with the Somali American Council of Oregon (SACOO), serving as its Chairman and official spokesperson. His duties with the organization include volunteering as a counselor, facilitator, interpreter and co-sponsor. SACOO offers guidance to new Somali families and works closely with state and federal authorities to strengthen civic relations.

Olol is a graduate of the FBI's Citizens Academy.

Awards

For his many contributions to the Somali community through SACOO, Olol was presented in Washington, D.C. with the FBI's 2011 Director's Community Leadership Award (DCLA). The prize is issued annually to individuals or groups that have earned distinction through service to society.

In 2014, Olol was named one of the 31 Arab Americans Who Have Had an Impact on America by Thrival Room.

References

Living people
Ethnic Somali people
Somali American
People from Mogadishu
Somalian activists
Somalian engineers
Somalian emigrants to the United States
Portland State University alumni
Year of birth missing (living people)
People from Oregon
Activists from Oregon